Hava Siegelmann is a professor of computer science. Her academic position is in the school of Computer Science and the Program of Neuroscience and Behavior at the University of Massachusetts Amherst; she is the director of the school's Biologically Inspired Neural and Dynamical Systems Lab and is the Provost Professor of the University of Massachusetts.  She was loaned to the federal government DARPA 2016-2019 to initiate and run their most advanced AI programs  including her Lifelong Learning Machine (L2M) program. and Guaranteeing AI Robustness against Deceptions (GARD). She received the rarely awarded Meritorious Public Service Medal — one of the highest honors the Department of Defense agency can bestow on a private citizen.

Biography
Siegelmann is an American computer scientist who founded the field of Super-Turing computation. As a DAPRA Program Manager she introduced the field of Lifelong Learning Machines, the most recent advancement in Artificial Intelligence, which is a great leap forward from the continual task-learning paradigm. She contributed some of the most significant research results in both Neural Networks and Lifelong Learning. For her lifetime contribution to the field of Neural Networks she was the recipient of the 2016 Donald Hebb Award. She earned her PhD at Rutgers University, New Jersey, in 1993.

In the early 1990s, she and Eduardo D. Sontag proposed a new computational model, the Artificial Recurrent Neural Network (ARNN), which has been of both practical and mathematical interest. They proved mathematically that ARNNs have well-defined computational powers that extend the classical Universal Turing machine. Her initial publications on the computational power of Neural Networks culminated in a single-authored paper in Science and her monograph, "Neural Networks and Analog Computation: Beyond the Turing Limit".

In her Science paper, Siegelmann demonstrates how chaotic systems (that cannot be described by Turing computation) are now described by the Super-Turing model. This is significant since many biological systems not describable by standard means (e.g., heart, brain) can be described as a chaotic system and can now be modelled mathematically.

The theory of Super-Turing computation has attracted attention in physics, biology, and medicine. Siegelmann is also an originator of the Support Vector Clustering, a widely used algorithm in industry, for big data analytics, together with Vladimir Vapnik and colleagues. Siegelmann also introduced a new notion in the field of Dynamical Diseases, "the dynamical health", which describes diseases in the terminology and analysis of dynamical system theory, meaning that in treating disorders, it is too limiting to seek only to repair primary causes of the disorder; any method of returning system dynamics to the balanced range, even under physiological challenges (e.g., by repairing the primary source, activating secondary pathways, or inserting specialized signaling), can ameliorate the system and be extremely beneficial to healing. Employing this new concept, she revealed the source of disturbance during shift work and travel leading to jet-lag and is currently studying human memory and cancer in this light.

Siegelmann has been active throughout her career in advancing and supporting minorities and women in the fields of Computer Science and Engineering. Through her career Siegelmann consulted with numerous companies, and has received a reputation for her practical problem solving capabilities. She is on the governing board of the International Neural Networks Society, and an editor in the Frontiers on Computational Neuroscience.

Publications

Papers
 
 H.T. Siegelmann and L.E. Holtzman, "Neuronal integration of dynamic sources: Bayesian learning and Bayesian inference," Chaos: Focus issue: Intrinsic and Designed Computation: Information Processing in Dynamical Systems 20 (3): DOI: 10.1063/1.3491237, September 2010. (7 pages)

Partial List of Applications

Books
 Neural Networks and Analog Computation: Beyond the Turing Limit, Birkhauser, Boston, December 1998

Notes and references

American women computer scientists
American computer scientists
Living people
University of Massachusetts Amherst faculty
American women academics
1964 births
21st-century American women